George Fuller (November 7, 1802 – November 24, 1888) was an American newspaperman and politician who served briefly as a Democratic member of the U.S. House of Representatives from Pennsylvania from 1844 to 1845.

Biography
George Fuller was born in Norwich, Connecticut. He later moved to Montrose, Pennsylvania and engaged in mercantile pursuits.

Fuller was elected as a Democrat to the Twenty-eighth Congress to fill the vacancy caused by the death of Almon H. Read.

He was editor of the Montrose Democrat, the Montrose Gazette, and the Susquehanna Register.

He served as treasurer of Susquehanna County, Pennsylvania. He was a member of the Republican Party during the last 25 years of his life. He died in Scranton, Pennsylvania in 1888 and was buried in Montrose.

Sources

The Political Graveyard

1802 births
1888 deaths
People from Susquehanna County, Pennsylvania
Democratic Party members of the United States House of Representatives from Pennsylvania
Pennsylvania Republicans
19th-century American politicians